Kurt Böwe (28 April 1929 – 14 June 2000) was a German actor. He appeared in more than ninety films from 1962 to 2000.

Selected filmography

References

External links 

1929 births
2000 deaths
German male film actors